Cucullia tanaceti is a moth of the family Noctuidae. The species was first described by Michael Denis and Ignaz Schiffermüller in 1775.

Description
Adults have greyish-brownish wings, while caterpillars are white with yellow longitudinal lines and black markings. Adults are on the wing from April to early June and from July to September.

It is a bivoltine species. In summer the larvae feed on Achillea, Tanacetum, Anthemis, Santolina, Ormenis, while in autumn they feed on Artemisia. Pupation last two years.

Distribution
This species is widespread in Europe, Near East, Asia Minor, Iran and Turkestan.

Habitat
They prefer xerophilous areas, dry sunny slopes and rocky places.

References
 
Catalogue of Life
BioLib
Fauna Europaea

Lot Moths and Butterflies

External links

Lépidoptères de France
Lepiforum e. V.
Moths and Butterflies of Europe and North Africa

Cucullia
Moths of Asia
Moths of Europe
Taxa named by Michael Denis
Taxa named by Ignaz Schiffermüller
Moths described in 1775